The 29th Assembly District of Wisconsin is one of 99 districts in the Wisconsin State Assembly. Located in northwest Wisconsin, the district comprises most of St. Croix County and part of western Dunn County.  It includes the cities of Glenwood City, Menomonie, and New Richmond, as well as the villages of Baldwin, Boyceville, Downing, Knapp, Hammond, Star Prairie, and Woodville.  The district contains the University of Wisconsin–Stout campus.  The district is represented by Republican Clint Moses, since January 2021.

The 29th Assembly district is located within Wisconsin's 10th Senate district, along with the 28th and 30th Assembly districts.

List of past representatives

References 

Wisconsin State Assembly districts
Dunn County, Wisconsin
St. Croix County, Wisconsin